Oncideres estebani is a species of beetle in the family Cerambycidae. It was described by Martins and Galileo in 2010. It is known from Costa Rica.

References

estebani
Beetles described in 2010